Jorge Andrés Ormeño Guerra (born 14 June 1977) is a Chilean retired footballer. 

He played for Primera División clubs like Santiago Wanderers or Universidad Católica.

Honours

Club
Santiago Wanderers
 Primera B (1): 1999
 Primera División de Chile (1): 2001

Universidad Católica
 Primera División de Chile (2): 2005 Clausura, 2010
 Copa Chile (1): 2011

References

1977 births
Living people
Chilean footballers
Chilean Primera División players
Santiago Wanderers footballers
Club Deportivo Universidad Católica footballers
Chile international footballers
Sportspeople from Viña del Mar
Association football midfielders